Salix kusanoi is a species of willow in the family Salicaceae. It is endemic to Taiwan. It is threatened by habitat loss.

The leaves are alternate, 9 cm long and 4 cm broad, with finely serrated edge and glands. Both sides of the leaves are green and have dark orange fine hairs. The hairs on the underside of the leaves are more obvious, and the hairs can be easily wiped off. The flowers are produced in early spring before the new leaves appear. It is dioecious, with male and female catkins on separate plants. The male catkins are 8–9 cm long; the female catkins are 3 cm long.

References

kusanoi
Endemic flora of Taiwan
Endangered plants
Trees of Taiwan
Taxonomy articles created by Polbot
Plants described in 1911